Adamantine may refer to:

 Adamant or adamantine, a generic name for a very hard material
 Adamantine (veneer)
 Adamantine lustre, non-metallic, brilliant light reflecting and transmitting properties of minerals
 Adamantine spar, mineral, a variety of corundum
 "Adamantine", a song by the band Thirty Ought Six

See also
 Adamant (disambiguation)
 Adamantane, a bulky hydrocarbon
 Adamantinoma, a form of bone cancer
 Adamantium, a fictional metal alloy appearing in comic books published by Marvel Comics
 Amantadine, a chemical compound